Sebastian Johansson (born April 22, 1991) is a Swedish-born American football offensive lineman  who is currently a free agent. He played college football at Marshall University.

Early years
Johansson played club football for the Carlstad Crusaders in his native Sweden before attending high school in Raceland, Kentucky, where he played for one season. He committed to Marshall University to play college football.

College career
Johansson was a three-year starter for Marshall University from 2013 to 2015. He committed to Marshall in 2011, but didn't play until 2013 as he spent the first two years adapting to major college football offensive line play.

Professional career
In the 2016 draft, Johansson went undrafted but was later signed by the San Diego Chargers. On May 16, the Chargers released Johansson.

References

External links
Marshall Thundering Herd football bio

1991 births
Living people
Swedish players of American football
Sportspeople from Karlstad
American football offensive tackles
Marshall Thundering Herd football players
Swedish expatriate sportspeople in the United States